Movies for the Blind is the debut solo studio album by American rapper Cage. It was released by Eastern Conference Records on August 6, 2002. It peaked at number 193 on the Billboard 200 chart.

Critical reception

Martin Woodside of AllMusic gave the album 3 stars out of 5, saying: "Most of the songs here are built around fantasy, and Cage's fantasies tend to be dark and angry, revolving around sex, violence, and substance abuse." He added: "The team of producers lays down a diverse blend of styles that matches Cage's bizarre, brooding vocals from beginning to end." Nathan Rabin of The A.V. Club said, "it confirms Cage as a major talent while going a long way toward justifying his reputation as an eccentric genius."

In 2015, Fact placed it at number 39 on the "100 Best Indie Hip-Hop Records of All Time" list.

Track listing

Personnel
Credits adapted from liner notes.

 Cage – vocals
 DJ Mighty Mi – turntables (4), production (1, 2, 7, 8, 11, 12, 13, 14, 15, 18)
 Rush – production (3)
 Camu Tao – production (4)
 The Ghetto Pros – production (5)
 J-Zone – production (6)
 Claire – vocals (7)
 Vere Isaacs – bass guitar (8)
 RJD2 – production (9)
 Riz – turntables (10)
 Necro – production (10)
 Stretch Armstrong – mixing (10)
 Reef – additional instruments (12)
 Mr. Eon – vocals (13)
 Copywrite – vocals (13, 18)
 El-P – production (17)
 Kieran Walsh – mixing
 Michael Sarsfield – mastering

Charts

References

External links
 
 

2002 debut albums
Cage (rapper) albums
Eastern Conference Records albums
Albums produced by El-P
Albums produced by J-Zone
Albums produced by RJD2